Danijela Nestorović (born 1974) is a Serbian lawyer, environmental activist, and politician. She was elected to the National Assembly of Serbia in the 2022 Serbian parliamentary election on the electoral list of the We Must (Moramo) coalition and is now a member of the Together (Zajedno!) party.

Private career and activism
Nestorović is a lawyer in Belgrade. She was a leading figure in the 2021–2022 Serbian environmental protests and helped to organize the legal defence of activists who were arrested for participating in these events. In January 2022, she announced plans for citizens to form roadblocks at different locations in Serbia as an act of civil disobedience against Rio Tinto's proposed jadarite mining near the Jadar River. In May of the same year, she drew attention to underground water pollution in the village of Lukavac, where the Canadian mining company Euro Lithium was operating, as a means of highlighting unsafe mining practices across the country.

Politician
Nestorović was a founding member of the Ecological Uprising (Ekološki ustanak, EU) political movement in 2021. This movement contested the 2022 parliamentary election as part of the Moramo coalition; Nestorović received the fourth position on its electoral list and was elected when the coalition won thirteen mandates. Nestorović also appeared in the seventieth position on the coalition's list in the concurrent 2022 Belgrade City Assembly election. Election from this position was not a viable prospect, and she was not elected when the list won thirteen mandates at the city level as well.

On 1 June 2022, Ecological Uprising joined with other groups that had participated in the "We Must" coalition to create a new party called Together (Zajedno!). Nestorović is now a member of this party. In the assembly, she is a member of the committee on the judiciary, public administration, and local self-government, and a deputy member of the committee on constitutional and legislative issues. The election was won by the Serbian Progressive Party (Srpska napredna stranka, SNS) and its allies, and the Together group serves in opposition.

In early October 2022, she accused the Serbian police of intimidating environmental activists during protests in Majdanpek. Acting as the legal representative of an activist detained in the community, she announced later in the month that she had filed criminal charges against police inspectors from Kladovo, whom she says "brutally beat" her client.

References

1974 births
Living people
Politicians from Belgrade
Members of the National Assembly (Serbia)
Ecological Uprising politicians
Together (Serbia) politicians